The 2015 CS U.S. International Figure Skating Classic was a senior international figure skating competition held in September 2015 at the Salt Lake City Sports Complex in Salt Lake City, Utah. It was part of the 2015–16 ISU Challenger Series. Medals were awarded in the disciplines of men's singles, ladies' singles, pair skating, and ice dancing.

Entries

Results

Medal summary

Men

Ladies

Pairs

Ice dancing

References

External links
 2015 U.S. International Figure Skating Classic at the International Skating Union

U.S. International Figure Skating Classic
U.S. International Figure Skating Classic, 2015
U.S. International Figure Skating Classic
Sports in Salt Lake City
U.S. International Figure Skating Classic
U.S. International Figure Skating Classic